The Secretary General of the Pacific Islands Forum Secretariat is the chief executive officer of the Pacific Islands Forum Secretariat (PIFS). The Secretariat is based in Suva, Fiji.

The Secretary General of the Secretariat is appointed to a three-year term in office by the leaders of the Pacific Islands Forum member states. The Secretary General reports directly to the leaders of the member states and the Forum Officials' Committee (FOC). He or she automatically serves as the permanent chairman or chairwoman of the Council of Regional Organisations in the Pacific (CROP).

Responsibilities 
The Secretary General is responsible for a variety of roles and responsibilities within the Pacific Islands Forum and the Secretariat. The responsibilities to PIF member states and observers include the following:

Providing "high quality" leadership to the member states.
Effectively bring executive management to the office of the Forum Secretariat, as well as its staff and assets.
Deliver advice and service to member nations of the Pacific Islands Forum.
Advocate the interests of the Pacific Islands Forum to other international organizations, as well as non-governmental organizations.
Leading and managing the Pacific Islands Forum (PIF), a meeting of the member states' national leaders, as well as the Forum Officials Committee (FOC). This role includes attending and leading the Pacific Islands Forum ministerial meetings, committees, councils and working groups which may be established by either the PIF or the FOC.
The Secretary General is chair of the Council of Regional Organisations in the Pacific (CROP).
Oversee the implementation of any mandates or directives of the Pacific Islands Forum and the Forum Officials Committee.
Effectively implement the Secretariat's work programme.

List of Secretaries General
Please note: Dates may not be correct.

See also
 Pacific Islands Forum

References

External links
 Pacific Islands Forum Secretariat

Secretary General